Disclosure, originally subtitled Disclosure: Trans Lives on Screen, is a 2020 American documentary film directed and produced by Sam Feder. The film follows an in-depth look at Hollywood's depiction of transgender people and the impact of their stories on transgender lives and American culture. It had its world premiere at the Sundance Film Festival on January 27, 2020. It was released on Netflix on June 19, 2020.

Synopsis
The film follows an in-depth look at Hollywood's depiction of transgender people and the impact of their stories on transgender lives and American culture. It features many famous transgender people in the film industry such as, Laverne Cox, Susan Stryker, Alexandra Billings, Jamie Clayton, Chaz Bono, Alexandra Grey, Yance Ford, Trace Lysette, Jazzmun, Michaela Jaé Rodriguez, Angelica Ross, Jen Richards, Elliot Fletcher, Brian Michael Smith, Sandra Caldwell, Candis Cayne,
Jessica Crockett, Zackary Drucker, Lilly Wachowski, Ser Anzoategui, Michael D. Cohen, Zeke Smith, and Leo Sheng. It takes the audience through a history lesson using films and television shows to show how damaging and inaccurate the depiction and ideas of transgender people were displayed throughout, mostly, American cinema. Some of these examples used include Ace Ventura, Bosom Buddies, Tootsie, Victor Victoria, To Kill a Mockingbird, and much more. Disclosure provides a direct conversation between transgender people and Hollywood by showcasing both sides of the conversation with direct examples in film history.

Cast 
 Laverne Cox
 Michaela Jaé Rodriguez 
 Angelica Ross 
 Susan Stryker 
 Alexandra Billings 
 Jamie Clayton 
 Chaz Bono
 Alexandra Grey
 Yance Ford 
 Trace Lysette 
 Jazzmun 
 Jen Richards 
 Elliot Fletcher 
 Brian Michael Smith
 Sandra Caldwell
 Candis Cayne
 Jessica Crockett 
 Zackary Drucker 
 Lilly Wachowski 
 Ser Anzoategui 
 Michael D. Cohen
 Zeke Smith 
 Leo Sheng
 Marquise Vilsón
 Bianca Leigh
 Tiq Milan
 Rain Valdez
 Nick Adams
 Chase Strangio
 Tre'vell Anderson
 Mickey R. Mahoney

Release
The film had its world premiere at the Sundance Film Festival on January 27, 2020. Shortly after, Netflix acquired distribution rights to the film and released it on the platform on June 19, 2020.

Critical response
Disclosure received positive reviews from film critics. , it holds  approval rating on review aggregator website Rotten Tomatoes, based on  reviews. The site's critics consensus reads: "Disclosure engrossingly illuminates the history and effects of the way transgender lives are portrayed on screen – and outlines how much progress still needs to be made."

Awards and nominations

See also
 The Celluloid Closet

References

External links
 
 

2020 films
African-American LGBT-related films
American documentary films
American LGBT-related films
Documentary films about LGBT topics
Documentary films about LGBT film
Transgender-related documentary films
2020 LGBT-related films
Netflix original documentary films
Documentary films about Hollywood, Los Angeles
2020 documentary films
2020s English-language films
2020s American films